The big scale archerfish (Toxotes oligolepis) is a species of fish in the family Toxotidae. It is endemic to the Molucca Islands (Indonesia) and possibly the Philippines. Almost nothing is known about this species and there is only a single confirmed specimen, which likely was collected from Bacan ("Batjan") Islands. It was formerly reported from Western Australia (in which case the common name western archerfish was used), but this is a separate species, T. kimberleyensis.

References

Fish of Indonesia
Archerfish
Fish described in 1876
Taxonomy articles created by Polbot